The Carrollton bus collision occurred on May 14, 1988, on Interstate 71 in unincorporated Carroll County, Kentucky. The collision involved a former school bus in use by a church youth group and a pickup truck driven by an alcohol-impaired driver. The head-on collision was the deadliest incident involving drunk driving and the third-deadliest bus crash in U.S. history. Of the 67 people on the bus (counting the driver), there were 27 fatalities in the crash, the same number as the 1958 Prestonsburg bus disaster, and behind the 1976 Yuba City bus disaster (29) and 1963 Chualar bus crash (32).

In the aftermath of the disaster, several family members of victims became active leaders of Mothers Against Drunk Driving, and one—Karolyn Nunnallee—became national president of the organization. The standards for both operation and equipment for school buses and similar buses were improved in Kentucky and many other states. These include an increased number of emergency exits, higher standards for structural integrity, and the use of less volatile diesel fuel. On Interstate 71, the crash site is marked with a highway sign erected by the Kentucky Transportation Cabinet. Memorial items such as crosses and flower arrangements are regularly placed at the site by families and friends.

Background
The group included church members and their invited guests. As everyone arrived early that Saturday morning, the number of those wanting to go on the trip had grown to more than originally anticipated. The church's principal pastor, who did not join the trip, restricted the ridership to the legal limit of 66 persons plus the driver.

Bus
The bus involved in the crash was a former school bus, configured with a bus body mated to a medium-duty truck chassis and frame.  The 1977 model-year Ford B700 chassis was mated to a Superior school bus body.  The vehicle was designed with a capacity of 66 passengers and a driver, including 11 rows of 39-inch wide seats, separated by a 12-inch central aisle.   

Ford Motor Company manufactured the B700 chassis at its Kentucky Truck Plant in Louisville, Kentucky; it was then shipped to Superior Coach Company of Lima, Ohio.  A company owned by industrial conglomerate  Sheller-Globe Corporation, Superior manufactured the school bus body that was installed on the Ford B700 chassis.  The vehicle was certified as a "school bus" with an effective build date of March 23, 1977, the date associated with the construction of the Ford chassis (as required by federal regulations).      

Both the vehicle type and the build date would later serve as important legal distinctions.  The bus was manufactured on March 23, 1977, just nine days before four major federal safety standards were to take effect for school bus production.  In addition to upgraded rollover protection, school buses produced on or after April 1, 1977 were required to be designed with improved structural integrity in body joints, better seating protection in crashes, and improved fuel system protection (to reduce spills and fires).          

The completed bus was delivered in time for use during the 197778 school year, and served ten years in use as a school bus. Radcliff Assembly of God acquired the used school bus as surplus from the Meade County school district, and it had been owned by the church for about one year as a church bus.  In July 1987, the church successfully made the same round trip with the bus to Kings Island.  Along with short local moves on school days, the church also drove the bus successfully on several other long trips.  It was maintained regularly by mechanically-inclined church members, including a civilian motor pool supervisor from nearby Fort Knox.  A week before the 1988 Kings Island trip, the bus received two new tires of a good commercial quality; the front-end suspension and steering components were also examined at that time.  The 11-year old vehicle was considered to be in good mechanical condition on May 14, 1988.

Trip

On the trip, the bus was driven by John Pearman, a part-time associate pastor of the church who was a local court clerk. The group left the church early that morning and traveled uneventfully to the park. They spent the whole day and early evening at Kings Island, then boarded the bus and began traveling out of Ohio and back into Northern Kentucky toward Radcliff. After about an hour, they stopped to fill the 60-gallon (227-litre) fuel tank with gasoline, then resumed the trip southward.

Collision
At 10:55 p.m., while heading south on Interstate 71 outside of Carrollton, Kentucky, the bus collided almost head-on with a black 1987 Toyota pickup truck which was traveling the wrong way (north in the southbound lanes) at a high speed on a curved stretch of the highway. The small truck was driven by Larry Wayne Mahoney, a 34-year-old factory worker who was intoxicated. Mahoney later admitted he had been drinking in a bar and at a friend's house prior to the collision. Police also found a twelve-pack of Miller Lite beer in Mahoney's truck which was still cold and had several cans missing.

During the collision, the left rear of the pickup truck spun 90 degrees to the right and, while doing so, struck the left side of a 1977 Cadillac Sedan de Ville heading in the same direction of the bus causing damage to the back driver's door and vinyl roof. The car had broken glass along with red plastic material that was from the taillight lens of the Toyota. The right front of the pickup truck struck the right front of the bus, breaking off the bus's suspension and driving the leaf spring backward into the gas tank mounted behind an exterior panel but outside the heavier frame, just behind the step well for the front door, rendering the door inoperative. The front door was blocked by collision damage, and there were no emergency exit windows or roof hatches, as found on commercial buses and some school buses of the time.

Nobody aboard the bus was seriously injured by the actual collision between the two vehicles (though both vehicle drivers sustained injuries). However, the impact of the collision created a secondary situation, as the right front suspension of the Ford chassis broke off through the bus stepwell, puncturing the gasoline fuel tank and igniting the fuel supply. When fire first broke out immediately after the collision, bus driver John Pearman tried to put it out with a small fire extinguisher while passengers began to evacuate through the center rear emergency door, squeezing through the narrow opening between the two rear seats and jumping to the ground.

A survivor recounted the accident and the quick time between everything, stating: "We knew we hit something, and...all the kids got up in the aisle thinking we were gonna get off. And within 20 second you felt the heat come in the bus. You started hearing kids crying and screaming for their mom, panicking. That's when everybody started pushing on everybody to go one way." Another remembered startling awake after the accident and attempting to escape through a window but it refused to open, before rushing to the back.

Survivors stated that after emptying the small fire extinguisher, Pearman helped some of the many children find their way down the narrow and dark aisle to the only practical way out of the smoke-filled bus. According to the NTSB investigation, more than 60 persons trying to reach the only available exit (the rear emergency door) created a crush of bodies in the 12 inch-wide aisle. Many passengers found themselves unable to move. A beverage cooler which had been earlier placed in the aisle near row 10 (of 11 rows of seats) further exacerbated this problem. A pileup of passengers formed in and adjacent to the  aisle leading to the rear door, which was partially blocked by seat backs from the last row and a cooler stored in the aisle near row 10.

Attempts by some of the other passengers to break or kick out any of the split-sash-type side windows were unsuccessful. Only one adult, a woman who was of small stature, managed to escape through a  opening side window. When she looked back up from the ground, the window opening was filled with flames. The other three adults aboard, including Pearman, died. A survivor recounted how when he reached the back door; "Someone on the outside grabbed my arm, put their foot on the bumper and literally pulled me out. I hit the asphalt and started running...I could hear the screams and the explosions."

However, within four minutes or less, the entire bus was on fire, and soon the exodus of passengers stopped. At that point, the passersby who had stopped to help could not reach those still aboard due to the raging fire, and turned their efforts to tending to the crowd of 40 mostly injured survivors. Soon the entire interior of the bus flashed over, ultimately burning the trapped 27 people remaining aboard. At that point, no more passengers were accessible from outside the bus.

After fire, rescue, and Kentucky State Police troopers responded to the scene, treated and transported survivors, and extinguished the fire, a crane was used to load the bus onto a flatbed truck that transported the bus and those persons killed to the National Guard Armory in Carrollton. There, the KSP and the Carroll County coroner went through the interior of the bus seat by seat to find and remove bodies. Most of the bodies were burned beyond recognition.

Victims 
In total, 26 passengers and the bus driver died, 34 passengers were injured, and six passengers escaped the bus without serious injury. Larry Mahoney, the driver of the Toyota pickup, sustained injuries from the collision. Of the deceased children, they ranged in age from 10 to 19-years-old, with a majority aged between 13 and 14-years-old. 

Many bodies were found facing the only exit, the rear door. The coroner later determined that none of the bus occupants suffered broken bones or mortal injuries from the crash impact; all had died from the fire and smoke. The victims are as follows. 

 Patricia Susan Nunnallee, 10, a 4th grader at Meadow View Elementary School. She was described as a good student, and had recently placed 3rd in a speech contest. 
 Robin Williams, 10, a 4th grader at Meadow View Elementary School. She was described as "sports-minded". Her sister and mother also perished in the crash.
 Lori Kathleen Hoizer, 11, a 6th grader at Radcliff Middle School. She did ballet in Germany while her father was stationed there. 
 Dwailla Dawn Fischel, 12, a 7th grader at Radcliff Middle School. She was originally from Fort Riley, Kansas. She was a nominee for the President's Award in Academics. She participated in the school's drama club and was a member of the First Assembly of God.
 Julie Ann Earnest, 12, a 7th grader at Radcliff Middle School. Her family had recently moved to Radcliff from Germany. She enjoyed reading, and had a 4.0 GPA. 
 Sandy Jean Brewer, 12, a 7th grader at Radcliff Middle School. She loved baseball, and was described as having a cheerful personality. 
 Cynthia Anne Atherton, 13, an 8th grader at Radcliff Middle School. She was described as energetic, and recently had her braces removed. She was a member of Stithton Baptist Church in Radcliff.
 Crystal Erin Uhey, 13, a 6th grader at Radcliff Middle School. She was very close with her family, and enjoyed armature music and drama productions.
 Denise Ellen Voglund, 13, an 8th grader at Radcliff Middle School. She was involved in her neighborhood softball league, and was described to always have a smile on her face.  
 Emillie S. Thompson, 13, an 8th grader at James P. Alton Junior High School in Vine Grove, Kentucky. She was described as bright and "all knees, elbows, and smiles". 
 Jennifer Ann Arnett, 13, an 8th grader at Radcliff Middle School. She played trumpet in band, and was known as a good babysitter. 
 Phillip Lee Morgan, 13, a 7th grader at James T. Alton Junior Highschool in Vine Grove, Kentucky. He played drums in the school band. 
 Amy Christine Wheelock, 14, an 8th grader at Radcliff Middle School. She was both a cheerleader and a gymnast, and played trumpet in the school band. 
 Chad Anthony Witt, 14, an 8th grader at Radcliff Middle School. He played drums in the school band and enjoyed basketball. 
 Kashawn R. Etheredge, 14, an 8th grader at Radcliff Middle School. She was on the girls basketball team, and was a member of the First Baptist Church of Elizabethtown.
 Kristian Williams, 14, an 8th grader at Radcliff Middle School. She was described as a sensitive girl. She played bass clarinet in the school band. She perished with her sister and her mother. 
 Mary Catheryn Daniels, 14, an 8th grader at Radcliff Middle School. She was an honors student, loved needlepoint, water-skiing, and never missed mass. She was a member of the St. Christopher Catholic Church in Radcliff.   
 Joshua Michael Conyers, 14, of Vine Grove. He was a 9th grader at North Hardin High School. He enjoyed karate, fishing, and playing basketball with his little brother. He was planning to go to college after graduation. His younger brother was reportedly in critical condition after the crash but survived. 
 Shannon Rae Fair, 14, an 8th grader at Radcliff Middle School. She was an honors student. She had recently been baptized and was a member of the Stithton Baptist Church.
 Tina Michelle Mustain, 14, an 8th grader at Radcliff Middle School. She was a member of the school band and girls' softball team. 
 April LuAnn Mills, 15, an 8th grader at Radcliff Middle School. She was remembered to be kind to everyone.  
 William Joseph Nicholas Jr., 17, a sophomore at Fort Knox Highschool. He was remembered to always be well dressed. 
 Anthony Marks, 15, a 9th grader at North Hardin Highschool. He managed the freshman basketball team and was remembered to be quick to make a friendship.
 Richard Keith Gohn, 19, a senior at North Hardin High School. Teachers describe him as an ideal student who worked hard, and wanted to learn. 
 Charles "Chuck" John Kytta, 34, of Elizabethtown. He was a loan officer at Citizens and Fidelity Bank and Trust, and served in the Vietnam War. 
 Joy Williams, 34, of Radcliff. She had just recently gained her real estate license. Two of her children, Kristen and Robin, also perished in the disaster.  
 John R. Pearman, 36, of Radcliff. He was driving the school bus at the time of the crash, and lost his life while trying to save passengers by working to extinguish the fire. 

Among the bus survivors, one person's leg from just below the knee had to be amputated, and about ten others suffered disfiguring burns. Only 6 bus passengers were uninjured and virtually all suffered varying degrees of emotional trauma and survivor guilt syndrome.

As of February 2010, this collision had the highest death and injury toll of any school bus crash in United States history; a crash near Prestonsburg, Kentucky, in 1958 also claimed 27 lives, but there were not as many additional injuries.

Investigation 
The National Transportation Safety Board responded, conducted an investigation and issued a report on March 28, 1989.

The NTSB determined that "the probable cause of the collision between the pickup truck and the church activity bus was the alcohol-impaired condition of the pickup truck driver who operated his vehicle opposite to the direction of traffic flow on an interstate highway." The agency also found that the design of the 11-year-old bus also contributed to the fatalities. The bus's fuel tank was unprotected, seat covers were made of flammable material, and the rear exit was partially blocked by a row of seats. Following the NTSB report, and much sooner in many instances, many federal, state, and local agencies and bus manufacturers changed regulations, vehicle features, and operating practices.

The board recommended the phaseout of buses not meeting the federal standards established in 1977. The standards required all new school buses to have stronger fuel tanks, stronger seats and more accessible emergency exits. At the time the report was issued, about 22% of school buses in use nationwide were built before the standards were in place. The board also recommended stricter punishments for drunk driving.

Legal 
There was considerable civil litigation. Ford Motor Company, Sheller-Globe Corporation, and others eventually contributed to settlements with all victims and/or their families.

Truck driver 
Mahoney had been previously arrested for driving under the influence in 1984, for which he was fined US$300 and his driver's license was suspended for six months. His blood alcohol concentration (BAC) two hours after the crash was .24 percent—substantially more than the 1988 Kentucky legal limit of .10. Mahoney had no memory of the crash and learned of the collision after waking in the hospital the next day.

Mahoney was indicted July 23, 1988, on 27 counts of murder. He pleaded not guilty, and bail was set at $270,000, $10,000 for each death in the crash. Prosecutors initially planned to seek an indictment for capital murder charges, but decided not to file those charges. Mahoney posted bail and was released from jail in October of 1988. On December 21, 1989, Mahoney was found guilty of all charges. He was sentenced to imprisonment for 16 years after a jury of the Carroll Circuit Court, under Indictment No. 88-CR-27, convicted him of 27 counts of manslaughter in the second degree, 16 counts of assault in the second degree, and 27 counts of wanton endangerment in the first degree. At trial, he was represented by the Cleveland, Ohio, criminal defense lawyer, William L. Summers. On appeal, in Case No. 1988-CA-1635, Judge Anthony M. Wilhoit of the Kentucky Court of Appeals reversed Mahoney's conviction for drunk driving on the grounds that it constituted double jeopardy under the Kentucky Constitution, ruling that the 27 counts of manslaughter in the second degree subsumed the drunk-driving conviction. The court ruled that, under Kentucky law, the elements of drunk driving were substantially similar to those of manslaughter. This meant that Mahoney's driver's license could be reinstated, even during his imprisonment. The Kentucky Supreme Court subsequently reversed this line of reasoning in another case, Justice v. Commonwealth, 987 S.W.2d 306 (Ky. December 17, 1998). On May 6, 1992, the Kentucky Supreme Court denied review of Mahoney's appeal in Case No. 1992-SC-98.

At the Kentucky State Reformatory, Mahoney worked in the medium-security facility as a clerk. He earned his GED high school equivalency diploma and attended Alcoholics Anonymous meetings. Described by authorities as a model prisoner, Mahoney reduced his incarceration by six years with good behavior, known under Kentucky law as "good time" credit. He declined the Kentucky Parole Board's parole recommendation and served out his sentence, before leaving the prison in La Grange, on September 1, 1999, having served nine and a half years. Local television stations broadcast video of him walking out of the prison.

That week, according to a published account in The Courier-Journal (Louisville), some survivors of the crash and families of the victims had said that they were willing to forgive Mahoney although the disaster marked forever the congregation of the First Assembly of God, which had many members on the bus.  "I feel a little bit sorry for him", Katrina Henderson, then 23, told The Courier-Journal in 1998. "He didn't wake up one day and say 'I'm going to kill 27 people.' That's not to take any blame away from him. I think that he is a person who made some very bad choices and he paid for those choices", said Henderson, who was age 12 when she survived the wreck. The victims were members of a church, and many felt called by their religious beliefs to forgive him.

During his trial, the idea was discussed that Mahoney could save lives by talking to school groups, but Mahoney has so far declined.

Aftermath

Changes in Kentucky

Shortly after the collision, governor Wallace Wilkinson ordered his cabinet to review the state's drunk driving laws and bus safety regulations. At a news conference on May 20, 1988, Wilkinson announced stricter enforcement of drunk driving by the state, including police sobriety checkpoints and more frequent inspections by state Alcoholic Beverage Control. The governor also indicated support for increased safety standards for buses and training for bus drivers, and the state began offering free safety inspections for privately owned buses.

Kentucky now requires all school buses to have nine emergency exits—more than any other federal or state standard. This includes front and back doors, a side door, four emergency windows and two roof exits. The bus that crashed at Carrollton had only front and back exits, which was to be expected, as the bus was built years before tougher standards were enacted.

Schools also must have a diesel-powered fleet. (Unlike gasoline, diesel fuel is not highly flammable.)

In 1991, Kentucky enacted stricter drunk driving laws.

School bus and church bus standards and regulations
A contributing factor to the crash itself and the severity seemed to be loopholes between the laws and procedures for a school bus and those involving the same vehicle after it was released from school service, but continued to be used for transporting passengers in non-school use. (Had the bus been built new in March 1977 for the non-school use such as a church activity bus, the applicable federal motor vehicle standards in place at that time would have required it to have been built with more emergency exits than were required for school buses). One of the NTSB recommendations after the Carrollton Bus Disaster was that school buses have no fewer emergency exits than required of non-school buses.

Some states also require that the usually different seating capacities for children and adults be displayed near the service door of school buses and non-school buses. Most states consider secondary school (middle and high school) age students to be adults with regards to the space occupied in bus seats and aisles by their bodies.

MADD and drunk driving prevention

The collision riveted the nation's attention on the problem of drunken driving as never before and has been credited in part with causing the steady decline in the number of alcohol-related fatalities. Mothers Against Drunk Driving, a grassroots organization, worked both before and after the Carrollton crash to reduce the hazards created by drunk (or drinking) drivers.

One of the victims, the youngest killed on the fatal bus, was ten-year-old Patricia "Patty" Susan Nunnallee. Patty's mother, Karolyn Nunnallee, became an active member of MADD after the crash, eventually becoming MADD's national president. Patty's mother wrote on MADD's memorial web page to Patty: They were traveling on a school bus, so I thought she'd be safe.

Janey Fair, whose 14-year-old daughter Shannon was killed, become a national volunteer for MADD, and rose within the organization to become national vice president. She was also head of the Kentucky Victims Coalition. According to the MADD website, "MADD helped me find my inner strength and see that life could go on," Janey said. "I have found I can make real changes in people's attitudes about drinking and driving and in how our government addresses this critical problem. Additionally, I can help other victims move forward in their lives." Her husband also became active locally in MADD.

Joy Williams, wife of Lee Williams, a pastor of the church, and their two young daughters, Kristen and Robin, were among those killed. Dotty Pearman's husband, John Pearman, associate pastor at the church and the bus driver, was also killed while their daughter, Christy, was involved in the crash and survived. In the year after the crash, Lee Williams and Dotty Pearman, who barely knew each other before the crash, became friends and eventually married. Lee and Dotty Williams also volunteer for MADD. Lee is a former chapter president of MADD in Hardin County, Kentucky, and Dotty is the current president. The couple often speaks to school groups, assists with health fairs and participates in other local events. "If I can persuade one person not to drink and drive, I've won", said Dotty. "I especially think it is important to educate children early on about the dangers of drinking and driving. We need to address the issue of alcohol with youth before it becomes a problem."

Memorials
Ford Motor Company paid for a black marble memorial in North Hardin Memorial Gardens Cemetery in Radcliff, Kentucky. The stone lists the names of all of the persons who were aboard the bus during the crash. The Kentucky Transportation Cabinet has two small signs, one in each direction of I-71, reading "SITE OF FATAL BUS CRASH MAY 14, 1988" at the site of the crash. There has been some controversy over the signs.

One of the survivors of the crash created a memorial and anti drunk driving message using a similar bus to the one in the accident, with the photos of the twenty-seven deceased students and the message "Twenty-seven reasons not to drink and drive" affixed to it.

Depiction in media
Among the many media agencies that provided thorough coverage, The Courier-Journal of Louisville, Kentucky, received the 1989 Pulitzer Prize for General News Reporting for its coverage.

The collision and its aftermath, including efforts of some of the families to obtain more than financial settlements, were chronicled by author James S. Kunen in his 1994 book Reckless Disregard: Corporate Greed, Government Indifference, and the Kentucky School Bus Crash.

In 2013, MADD produced a documentary about the crash titled Impact: After the Crash.

See also
 List of traffic collisions

References

Citations

Sources

External links
 Cincinnati Enquirer (1998): 10th Anniversary of 1988 Bus Crash, with links
 Cincinnati Enquirer (1998): Larry Mahoney on the 10th Anniversary of 1988 Bus Crash
 
 Pentecostal Evangel (February 29, 2004): Inferno on Interstate 71

Bus incidents in the United States
1988 road incidents
1988 in Kentucky
Alcohol-related deaths in Kentucky

Transportation in Carroll County, Kentucky

Hardin County, Kentucky

Interstate 71
Driving under the influence
Transportation disasters in Kentucky
Road incident deaths in Kentucky
May 1988 crimes
May 1988 events in the United States
Assemblies of God